Korand (also Romanized as Korand; also known as Kuren) is a village in Korand Rural District, Dashli Borun District, Gonbad-e Qabus County, Golestan Province, Iran. At the 2006 census, its population was 4,342, in 969 families.

References 
https://www.instagram.com/Koran.ir/

Populated places in Gonbad-e Kavus County